Sam Wood (born 11 July 1997) is an English professional rugby league footballer who plays for as a  or er for Hull Kingston Rovers in the Super League.

He has spent time on loan from Huddersfield at Oldham(Heritage № 1361), Halifax and the Batley Bulldogs in the Championship, and Workington Town in Betfred League 1.

Background
Wood was born in Dewsbury, West Yorkshire, England.

Playing career

Huddersfield Giants
Sam is a product of the Huddersfield academy system and has played in many positions for the Giants over the years.
In 2016 he made his Huddersfield Super League début against the Wigan Warriors.

Dewsbury Rams (loan)
On 26 May 2021 it was reported that he had signed for the Dewsbury Rams in the RFL Championship on loan.

Hull Kingston Rovers
On 14 Nov 2021 it was reported that he had signed for Hull Kingston Rovers in the Super League

References

External links
Huddersfield Giants profile
SL profile

1997 births
Living people
Batley Bulldogs players
Dewsbury Rams players
English rugby league players
Halifax R.L.F.C. players
Huddersfield Giants players
Hull Kingston Rovers players
Oldham R.L.F.C. players
Rugby league centres
Rugby league players from Dewsbury
Workington Town players